Jordyn W. Brooks (born October 21, 1997) is an American football linebacker for the Seattle Seahawks of the National Football League (NFL). He played college football at Texas Tech and was drafted by the Seahawks in the first round of the 2020 NFL Draft.

Early life and high school career
Brooks was born in Dallas, Texas and later moved to Houston, Texas where he grew up. He attended Stratford High School. Brooks was named All-District 19-5A in his junior and senior seasons. Brooks committed to play college football at Texas Tech University over offers from Arkansas, Houston, Missouri and Washington.

College career
Brooks was named a freshman All-American by 24/7 Sports and honorable mention All-Big 12 Conference after leading Texas Tech with 86 tackles (five for loss) with four passes broken up and a forced fumble. As a sophomore he finished third on the team in tackles with 89 (0.5 for loss) with an interception and two passes broken up and was again named honorable mention All-Big 12. Brooks was named honorable mention All-Big 12 for a third straight season after leading the Red Raiders with 84 tackles and with 7.5 tackles for loss with three sacks and an interception.

Going to his senior season, Brooks was named to the Butkus Award watch list and was named the top inside linebacker prospect for the 2020 NFL Draft by ESPN analyst Mel Kiper. He made 19 tackles with three sacks in an upset win over #21 Oklahoma State on October 5, 2019, and was named the Big 12 Defensive Player of the Week and the national defensive player of the week by the Football Writers Association of America and the Walter Camp Football Foundation (WCFF). Brooks was named first-team All-Big 12 and a consensus second-team All-American selection after recording 108 tackles, including 20 tackles for loss and three sacks. Brooks finished his collegiate career with 367 tackles (seventh-most in school history), 33 tackles for loss and seven sacks with two interceptions, two forced fumbles and three fumbles recovered.

Professional career

Brooks was drafted by the Seattle Seahawks in the first round with the 27th overall pick in the 2020 NFL Draft.

2020: Rookie season

Brooks was named as the backup weakside linebacker to starter K. J. Wright to begin the season. Brooks ended up playing seven snaps in the team's week 1 game against the Atlanta Falcons where he recorded his first career NFL tackle. Following the season-ending injury Bruce Irvin suffered after the team's week 2 victory over the New England Patriots, the team announced that Brooks would replace Irvin as the starter. In a week 13 game against the New York Giants, Brooks recorded 4 solo tackles and 6 assists, the most he had all season. He was the co-leader in tackles that game, with Jamal Adams also finishing with 10. In a week 16 game against the Los Angeles Rams, Brooks recorded 7 solo tackles and 1 assist, leading the team with Jamal Adams and D. J. Reed. He ended his rookie season with a total of 57 total tackles, and 2 pass deflections.

2022
Following the Seahawks' 23-6 victory over the New York Jets in Week 17, it was announced that Brooks had suffered a torn ACL and was placed on injured reserve. He finished the season with a team-high 161 tackles, one sack, five passes defensed, and a forced fumble.

Personal life
Brooks is a Christian. In November 2022, he helped distribute 10,000 cans of soup with Campbell’s Chunky.

References

External links
Seattle Seahawks bio
Texas Tech Red Raiders bio

1997 births
Living people
Players of American football from Houston
American football linebackers
Texas Tech Red Raiders football players
Seattle Seahawks players